Fyodor Borisov (born 5 February 1892, date of death unknown) was a Russian cyclist. He competed in two events at the 1912 Summer Olympics.

References

External links
 

1892 births
Year of death missing
Male cyclists from the Russian Empire
Olympic competitors for the Russian Empire
Cyclists at the 1912 Summer Olympics
Cyclists from Moscow